Calixte Duguay,   (born July 15, 1939) is a multi-disciplinarian Canadian artist born in Ste-Marie-St-Raphaël, on Lamèque Island.

In 2009, he was made a Member of the Order of Canada "for the impact he has had on the Acadian and Canadian music scene as a writer, composer and singer".

In 2010 he was awarded the Lieutenant-Governor's Award for High Achievement in the Arts for his music. In 2012, he was made a member of the Order of New Brunswick.

Discography
 Les aboiteaux
 Louis Mailloux (first production – 1979)
 Retour à Richibouctou
 Rien que pour toi
 Les couleurs de ma vie
 De terre et d'eau
 Louis Mailloux (new production, 1993)

Bibliography 
 Odette Castonguay, Calixte Duguay : aussi longtemps que je vivrai, Tracadie-Sheila: Grande Marée, 2006, .
 Calixte Duguay, Alentour de l'île et de l'eau, Éditions du kapociré, 1996.
 Calixte Duguay et Jules Boudreau, Louis Mailloux, Éditions d'Acadie, 1994.

References

Members of the Order of Canada
1939 births
Living people
Members of the Order of New Brunswick
People from Gloucester County, New Brunswick